Neoscona punctigera is a widespread species of orb-weaver spider found from Japan to mainland Asia, Australia and several Western Indian Ocean islands.

It is well-camouflaged during the day when sitting on bark, but when it hunts during the night it sits in the web and attracts insect prey with its bright, contrasting spots on the underside of the abdomen. N. punctigera builds spiral shaped webs.

This spider and close relatives (for example, N. vigilans) are commonly found in the Philippines, where the females frequently are used for spider fighting.

References

Bensen, Amanda, et al. Wild Things- Life as We Know It Smithsonian Magazine. March 2008. Volume 38. Number 12. Pg 12.

punctigera
Spiders of Asia
Spiders described in 1857